Lourdes Munguía (born Lourdes María Guadalupe Munguía Gasque; December 12, 1960 in Mexico City, D.F., Mexico) is a Mexican actress.

Filmography

References

External links

1960 births
Living people
Mexican telenovela actresses
Mexican television actresses
Mexican film actresses
20th-century Mexican actresses
21st-century Mexican actresses
Actresses from Mexico City
People from Mexico City